Alastair George Maitland CBE (30 January 1916 – 21 December 2011) was a British diplomat.

Biography 
He was born in Kampala, Uganda, the son of a colonial service botanist. He was educated at the University of Edinburgh.

Maitland served as a diplomat in Canada, Jerusalem and the United States, culminating in his appointment as consul-general in Boston . After retiring, he settled in Boston, Massachusetts, with his wife Betty. He then married Hazel Porter and retired to Heath, Massachusetts to live out the rest of his life.

References

1916 births
2011 deaths
People from Kampala
Alumni of the University of Edinburgh
British expatriates in Canada
British expatriates in the United States
Commanders of the Order of the British Empire
Consuls-General of the United Kingdom to Jerusalem
British expatriates in Uganda